Royal Air Force Rhoose or more simply RAF Rhoose is a former Royal Air Force satellite station located near Rhoose, a few miles west of Cardiff, Wales.

History

It opened on 7 April 1942 as an RAF training base for Supermarine Spitfire pilots.

No. 53 Operational Training Unit Llandow was the parent station, and Rhoose was a satellite landing ground.

Other units included:
 No. 7 Air Gunners School RAF
 No. 59 Maintenance Unit RAF
 No. 65 Gliding School RAF (1944-??)

See also
Cardiff Airport, which now occupies the site
MOD St Athan, a separate but close-by RAF station

References

Citations

Bibliography

Royal Air Force stations in Wales
Rhoose